State Highway 187 (SH 187) was a highway near Paonia, Colorado.

Route description
It crossed over the North Fork of the Gunnison River and ended at a junction with SH 133 north of town.

History
The highway was transferred from Colorado Department of Transportation jurisdiction to Delta County in the end of 2010.

Major intersections

References

External links

Colorado Highways: Routes 180 to 199

187
Transportation in Delta County, Colorado